Howden Court Hotel in Torquay, Devon  is listed on the English Heritage Register as Grade II. It was built in about 1860. Today it is a hotel.

References

Torquay
Hotels in Devon